Hludana (or Dea Hludana) is a Germanic goddess attested in five ancient Latin inscriptions from the Rhineland and Frisia, all dating from 197–235 AD.

Three of these inscriptions come from the lower Rhine, one from Münstereifel and one from Beetgum, Frisia.  The name appears as Hluθena on the Iversheim inscription from Münstereifel, and as Hlucena on that from Monterberg in the lower Rhine. The name is abbreviated in an inscription from Nijmegen on the lower Rhine ([H]lud.); it appears as Hludana in the inscriptions from Xanten (lower Rhine) and Beetgum. The Beetgum inscription, dedicated by a group of fishermen, originally accompanied a carving of a seated goddess, of which only the bottom can now be seen. On etymological grounds, the name Hludana is closely related to Old Greek κλυδων and κλυδωνα (kludoon(a) 'high waves, rough water') and the Ancient Greek-derived Euroclydon, meaning a violent north-eastern wind. The linguist Walther Kuhn suggested that it might be derived from Poseidon's spouse Kleito, as mentioned in Plato's dialogues.

There is no proven connection between Hludana and Holda. Jacob Grimm suggested in Deutsche Mythologie that Hludana was to be identified with the Norse earth-goddess Hlóðyn.

References 

Germanic goddesses
Germanic deities